Sir Salvador Moncada, FRS, FRCP, FMedSci (born 3 December 1944) is a Honduran-British pharmacologist and professor. He is currently Research Domain Director for Cancer at the University of Manchester.

In the past, he was the Research Director of the Wellcome Research Laboratories from 1986 to 1995 and, until recently, the Director of the UCL Wolfson Institute, which he established at University College London in 1996. His research interests include inflammation and vascular biology and he is currently working on the regulation of cell proliferation. He gained fame for his discoveries related to nitric oxide function and metabolism, and his exclusion from the 1996 Lasker Award and the 1998 Nobel Prize in medicine.

Early life and education
Moncada was born in Tegucigalpa, Honduras, to Salvador Moncada and Jenny Seidner on 3 December 1944, and moved to El Salvador in 1948.  He studied medicine at the Facultad de Medicina, Universidad de El Salvador from 1962 to 1970. In 1971 he went to London to work on a PhD with John Vane in the Department of Pharmacology in the Institute of Basic Medical Sciences, Royal College of Surgeons. After a short period of research in the National Autonomous University of Honduras he moved to the Wellcome Research Laboratories (Beckenham, Kent), where he became director of research in 1986.  In 1996 he moved to University College London, where he set up the Wolfson Institute for Biomedical Research in the Cruciform Building, which he directed until 2012.

Research
His scientific career began at the Royal College of Surgeons, where he collaborated in the discovery that aspirin-like drugs inhibit prostaglandin biosynthesis.  This finding elucidated the mechanism by which these drugs act as analgesic, antipyretic, and anti-inflammatory agents and also explained the mechanism by which they cause gastric damage.  In 1975, at the Wellcome Research Laboratories, he led the team that discovered the enzyme thromboxane synthase and the vasodilator prostacyclin.  This work contributed to the understanding of how low doses of aspirin prevent cardiovascular episodes such as myocardial infarction and stroke.  As director of research at the Wellcome Research Laboratories he presided over the discovery and development of lamotrigine (an anti-epileptic compound), atovaquone (an anti-malarial) and zomig (for treatment of migraine headaches), and initiated the work that resulted in the development of lapatinib for the treatment of breast cancer.  He was also responsible for the identification of nitric oxide as a biological mediator and the elucidation of the metabolic pathway leading to its synthesis.  A great deal of the early work on the biological significance of nitric oxide in the cardiovascular system came from his laboratory, as well as some fundamental information about the role of nitric oxide in the peripheral and central nervous systems and in cancer.  His later work has focused on the areas of mitochondrial biology and cell metabolism.  Most recently, his work has led to the finding of the molecular mechanism that coordinates cell proliferation with the provision of metabolic substrates required for this process.

Publications
Moncada is the author of more than 500 peer-reviewed papers and highly cited reviews, including

Other interests
Moncada is interested in medical education and in the development of science and technology in Latin America.  He has been a consultant of the Panamerican Health Organization (PAHO, the regional office of the WHO) and in recent years he founded Honduras Global – an international network of experts involved in supporting the development of Honduras.

Awards and honours
Moncada is an elected member of a number of international scientific societies. Foreign Member of the National Academy of Sciences of the United States of America (1994); Fellow of the Royal College of Physicians, London (1994), and Honorary Fellow of University College, London (1999). He was elected a Fellow of the Royal Society (FRS) in 1988.

He has received honorary degrees from more than twenty universities, including Honorary Degree of Doctor of Science, Mount Sinai School of Medicine, New York City (1995); Degree of Doctor "Honoris Causa" of the University Pierre & Marie Curie, Paris, France (1997) and Honorary Degree of Doctor of Science of the University of Edinburgh, Scotland (2000).

His prizes and distinguished lectures include: The VIII Gaddum Memorial Lecture, British Pharmacological Society (1980); The Prince of Asturias Award (1990); The Ulf von Euler Memorial Lecture, Karolinska Institute, Stockholm, Sweden (1991); The Paul Dudley White Lecture, American Heart Association, Anaheim, California, USA (1991); The Royal Medal of the Royal Society, UK (1994); The Gregory Pincus Memorial Lecture, the Worcester Foundation for Biomedical Research, Massachusetts, USA (1996); The Louis and Artur Lucian Award (jointly with Prof. R. Furchgott), McGill University, Montreal, Canada (1997); The Bayliss-Starling Prize Lecture to the Physiological Society, UK (2000); The Gold Medal of the Royal Society of Medicine, UK (2000); Le Grand Prix Annuel Lefoulon-Delalande, from the Institut de France, Paris (2002); the Croonian Lecture at the Royal Society, London, UK (2005), the Debrecen Award for Molecular Medicine from the University of Debrecen, Hungary (2011) and The Dohme Lecture, The Johns Hopkins University School of Medicine, Baltimore (2010).

In January 2010 he was created a Knight Bachelor for Services to Science. In 2013 he was awarded the Ernst Jung Gold Medal for Medicine (Ernst Jung Prize).

Personal life
He was married to Dorys Lemus, a biochemistry teacher at the Medical School in El Salvador.  The marriage resulted in two children, Claudia Regina (born 1966 – a G.P. who lives in London) and Salvador Ernesto, (1972–1982). On 5 April 1998, in London, he married Princess Marie-Esméralda of Belgium. They have two children, Alexandra Leopoldine (born in London on 4 August 1998) and Leopoldo Daniel (born in London on 21 May 2001), and two grandchildren.

References

External links 

 

Honduran emigrants to El Salvador
Salvadoran people of Honduran descent
British pharmacologists
Fellows of the Royal College of Physicians
Fellows of the Royal Society
1944 births
Living people
People from Tegucigalpa
Foreign associates of the National Academy of Sciences
Knights Bachelor
Winners of the Heineken Prize